Paul Robeson: Tribute to an Artist is a 1979 American short documentary film directed by Saul J. Turell. In 1980, it won an Oscar at the 52nd Academy Awards for Documentary Short Subject. It was released alongside Robeson's other films on a Criterion Collection box set in 2007.

Cast
 Paul Robeson as himself (archive footage)
 Sidney Poitier as narrator (voice)
 Margaret Webster as herself - director of Othello (voice, uncredited, and archive footage)

References

External links
Paul Robeson: Tribute to an Artist at Janus Films

Criterion Collection

1979 films
1979 short films
1979 documentary films
American independent films
American short documentary films
Best Documentary Short Subject Academy Award winners
Documentary films about African Americans
Documentary films about actors
Works about Paul Robeson
1970s English-language films
1970s American films